Llanllwchaiarn or Llanllwchaearn  in Welsh) is a village on the outskirts of Newtown in Powys, Wales. It forms part of the community of Newtown and Llanllwchaiarn.

Aberbechan Hall was a Tudor mansion in the eastern part of the parish demolished in 1870.

The wards of Llanllwchaiarn North and Llanllwchaiarn West elect up to four councillors to Newtown and Llanllwchaiarn Town Council.

See also 
 St Llwchaiarn's Church, Llanllwchaiarn

Literature
Oliver H. N, (2000), ‘‘Llanllwchaiarn: Church and Parish’’, Newtown.

References

External links 
Photos of Llanllwchaiarn and surrounding area on geograph

Historic Montgomeryshire Parishes
Villages in Powys